Beechview  is a neighborhood in Pittsburgh, Pennsylvania's southwestern side. It has a zip code of 15216, and has representation on Pittsburgh City Council by both the council member for District 4 (South Neighborhoods) and for District 2 (West Neighborhoods).  Beechview was founded in 1905 after the introduction of a comprehensive light rail transit system.  It is Pittsburgh Fire Bureau Zone 4-10 and houses Engine Company #28. It is located in Zone 6 for Pittsburgh Police. While Beechview took an economic downturn in the late 20th century, its proximity to downtown Pittsburgh, convenient access to light rail transit, sweeping vistas and new businesses have allowed Beechview to stabilize economically.

Geography
Despite Beechview's hilly terrain, its streets follow a grid pattern, resulting in some extremely steep roads. This includes Canton Avenue, the steepest street in the U.S., at a 37% grade.

Surrounding and adjacent neighborhoods
Beechview has six borders, including the Pittsburgh neighborhoods of Duquesne Heights to the north, Mt. Washington to the northeast, Brookline to the south and southeast, Banksville to the west, and Ridgemont to the northwest (separated by the Parkway West I-376).  The borough of Dormont borders Beechview from the southwest.

Travel
Beechview is served by the Dawn, Westfield, Fallowfield, Hampshire, Belasco and Shiras Pittsburgh Light Rail Red Line stations.

See also
 List of Pittsburgh neighborhoods

References

Further reading

External links

Interactive Pittsburgh Neighborhoods Map

Neighborhoods in Pittsburgh